The Bangabhaban ( Bôngobhôbôn, lit. House of Bengal) is the official residence and principal workplace of the president of Bangladesh, located on Bangabhaban Road, and short road connecting Dilkusha Avenue, Dhaka. It is surrounded by the Bangabhaban Gardens (formerly Nawab's Dilkusha Gardens).

The site hosted the Dilkusha Government House during British rule which was used by the viceroy of India and the governor of Bengal. The house was the official governor's residence of East Pakistan after the creation of Pakistan. President Abu Sayeed Chowdhury became the first Bangladeshi president to reside there after taking oath on 12 January 1971. The President Guard Regiment unit is responsible for the palace's security.

History

During the period of the sultanate of Bengal, a Sufi saint, Hazrat Shahjalal Dakhini of Dhaka, and his followers were killed by agents of the sultan and buried on the site of Bangabhaban. The site soon became famous as a mazhar (mausoleum) for the devotees of the saint. It is conjectured that it belonged to a zamindar during the early period of British rule. Later Nawab of Dhaka Sir Khwaja Abdul Ghani bought the site and built a bungalow there, which he named as Dilkusha Garden.

With the partition of Bengal in 1905 by Lord Curzon, the government of East Bengal and Assam bought the site and constructed a palatial house which served as a temporary residence for the Viceroy of India until 1911. On 14 February 1906, Sir Joseph Bamfylde Fuller, the first Lieutenant-Governor of the then province of East Bengal and Assam started his official work at the Darbar Hall of the Bangabhaban during British Rule. From 1911 to 1947, the palace was called the Governor's House, and served as the official residence of the governor of Bengal. Following the departure of the British and the independence of the Dominion of Pakistan and Dominian of India in 1947, Bengal province officially became part of Pakistan and was known as East Bengal, the palace became the residence of the governor of East Bengal. In 1955 the province of East Bengal became East Pakistan. The building was damaged by a storm in 1961; substantial reconstruction was completed by 1964.

A book, Hundred Years of Bangabhaban, on the history of the Bangabhaban was published in 2006.

Status

One of the most important symbols of the Bangladesh government, the Bangabhaban holds a status akin to the official residence and office of heads of states around the world. The palace is an important historical landmark and the centre of media and tourist attraction. Special public ceremonies are held during Independence Day of Bangladesh on 26 March every year. The Bangladesh president frequently holds meetings, conferences and state dinners for all occasions representing Bangladesh, including national leaders, intellectuals and visiting foreign heads of states and ambassadors. The traditions and pomp of the palace are a symbolic indication of the presidency's ceremonial superiority to other public and national institutions.

Structure

The Bangabhaban is a mix of Moghul architecture with touches of British era designs that typify numerous buildings of the British-era (1857–1947) in Dhaka. With the reconstruction between 1961 and 1964, many elements of Islamic architecture and Bangla styles were incorporated. The palace has high boundary walls on all four sides. The main building is a three-storeyed palatial complex, around which stands extensive greenery and tree cover. The floorspace of the ground floor is 7000 square metres. The president's residence is on the north-east corner, comprising two storeys of two suites along with five well-furnished spacious bedrooms.

The president's office, the office of the civil and military secretaries and other presidential officials, and separate rooms for audience with local and foreign visitors are also located in the ground floor. In addition, there is a cabinet room, banquet hall, darbar hall (court), state dining hall, a small auditorium and a lounge for local visitors. In addition to the president's residence, there are five rooms for officials, a control room and a studio in the first floor. In the second floor, there are four suites for foreign heads of state and government.

The security office, post office, bank, cafeteria hall, tailoring shop, a three-domed mosque and barracks of the president's guard regiment are located in the vicinity of the main gate of the Bangabhaban. The residential quarters for officers and staff of the President's office are located in three outlying areas of Bangabhaban. There are also two bungalows one for the military secretary and the other for the assistant military secretary.

See also
 Politics of Bangladesh
 Prime Minister of Bangladesh
 List of presidents of Bangladesh

References

 Bangabhaban on Banglapedia
 100 years of Bangabhaban
 100 years of Bangabhaban Book

Government Houses of the British Empire and Commonwealth
Houses completed in 1905
Houses completed in 1964
Buildings and structures in Dhaka
Official residences in Bangladesh
Presidential residences
Palaces in Bangladesh
1905 establishments in India